Lord of Casa Lazcano is a hereditary title in the Peerage of Spain accompanied by the dignity of Grandee, granted in 1780 by Charles III to Joaquín de Arteaga y Lazcano, descendant of the fiefdom of the Lords of Lazcano originally created in 1330 by Alfonso XI.

Lords of Casa Lazcano (1780)

Joaquín de Arteaga y Lazcano, 1st Lord of Casa Lazcano
Ignacio Ciro de Arteaga e Idiázquez, 2nd Lord of Casa Lazcano
Andrés Avelino de Arteaga y Palafox, 3rd Lord of Casa Lazcano
Andrés Avelino de Arteaga y Silva, 4th Lord of Casa Lazcano
Joaquín Ignacio de Arteaga y Echagüe, 5th Lord of Casa Lazcano
Iñigo de Arteaga y Falguera, 6th Lord of Casa Lazcano
Iñigo de Arteaga y Martín, 7th Lord of Casa Lazcano
Almudena de Arteaga y del Alcázar, 8th Lady of Casa Lazcano

See also
List of lords in the peerage of Spain
List of current Grandees of Spain

References

Lords of Spain
Lists of Spanish nobility